Qadamjo  (formerly Karasakol) is a village in Sughd Region, northern Tajikistan. It is part of the jamoat Nofaroj in the city of Istaravshan. It is located along the M34 highway.

Notes

References

Populated places in Sughd Region